Poneridia semipullata, the figleaf beetle, is a species of skeletonizing leaf beetle in the family Chrysomelidae, found mainly in Australia.

References

Galerucinae
Beetles of Australia
Beetles described in 1864
Taxa named by Hamlet Clark